Coderre ) is a village in the Canadian province of Saskatchewan within the Rural Municipality of Rodgers No. 133 and Census Division No. 7. The village is located approximately 85 km southwest of the City of Moose Jaw on Highway 627.

History 
Coderre incorporated as a village on August 26, 1925.

Geography

Climate

Demographics 

See also
 List of communities in Saskatchewan
 Villages of Saskatchewan

References

Villages in Saskatchewan
Rodgers No. 133, Saskatchewan
Division No. 7, Saskatchewan